is a Prefectural Natural Park in eastern Hokkaidō, Japan. Established in 1962, the park spans the municipalities of Betsukai, Nemuro, and Shibetsu.

See also
 National Parks of Japan
 Ramsar Sites in Japan

References

External links 
  Map of Natural Parks of Hokkaidō
  Map of Notsuke-Fūren Prefectural Natural Park

Parks and gardens in Hokkaido
Protected areas established in 1962
1962 establishments in Japan